Tony Ray (born in Kingston, Jamaica) is a Jamaican-Israeli musician. He is most noted as being the pioneer of Reggae in Israel as he released I Feel Like Reggae in 1981 which was the first full-length reggae album in the country.

Career
In 1963 Tony Ray moved with his family to Bristol and there he started to be involved with music. His first band was The Lurks, he played the bass and was the vocalist of the band. Later on he played with The Cocktails and toured in Europe and the Middle East.

In 1970 he relocated to Tel Aviv after a tour in Israel with The Cocktails. In 1981 he released his debut album which had songs both in English and Hebrew, the album received medium success. Since then he has released seven more albums and in 1998 he opened the Rasta Club in Tel Aviv, which is one of the only clubs in Israel dedicated for Reggae music.

In 1986 Ray and his band had a brief appearance in the film Alex Holeh Ahavah. He also was a musical guest on the sketch comedy TV series Zehu Ze!. Tony had a small role in the second season finale of Shemesh.

Discography
1981 I Feel Like Reggae
1985 Burn de Wicked Man
1987 Reggae Man
1990 Do De Reggae
1995 Drive Me Crazy
2007 The Voice of Jamaica
2013 Children of the World
2015 No More Wars

References

External links
Tony Ray on Myspace

1950 births
Living people
Musicians from Kingston, Jamaica
21st-century Israeli male singers
Jamaican songwriters
Jamaican reggae singers
20th-century Jamaican male singers
Israeli songwriters
20th-century Israeli male singers
Jamaican emigrants to Israel
People from Tel Aviv